Kilsyth is a suburb of Melbourne, Victoria, Australia, 36 km east from Melbourne's central business district (CBD), located within the City of Maroondah and the Shire of Yarra Ranges local government areas.

Most of Kilsyth is located within the Shire of Yarra Ranges, the rest is within the City of Maroondah.

History
The town was originally named after Kilsyth in Scotland. The suburb lies predominantly on cleared land which was originally used for orchards.

The Post Office opened on 22 November 1900. The first school opened in April 1910, and is now known as Kilsyth Primary School.

Retail and industrial
There are two main shopping precincts in Kilsyth, Churinga Shopping Centre and Kilsyth Shopping Centre. Smaller shopping strips are located on Colchester Road, Collins Place, and Hawthory Road.

Kilsyth comprises a significant industrial area on Canterbury Road, stretching from Liverpool Road to Dorset Road.

Education

Kilsyth has four primary schools:
 Kilsyth Primary School
 Ghilgai School
 Gladesville Primary School
 St Richard's Primary School

Sport and community facilities
The Elizabeth Bridge Reserve on Durham Road provides a playground, lake, and community centre. There are various other parks and reserves throughout the suburb.

Kilsyth is home to a range of sporting teams and facilities:
 Kilsyth Cobras representative basketball club
 Kilsyth Redbacks cricket club, competing in the Ringwood and District Cricket Association
 Lilydale Swimming Club, which trains at the Kilsyth Centenary Pool on Hawthory Road
Kilsyth Cougars AFL team, competing in the Eastern Football League
 Eastwood Golf Club on Liverpool Road
 Mountain District Badminton Association at the Kilsyth Sports Center on Liverpool Road Kilsyth

See also 
 City of Croydon – Parts of Kilsyth were previously within this former local government area.
 Shire of Lillydale – Parts of Kilsyth were previously within this former local government area.

References

Suburbs of Melbourne
Suburbs of the City of Maroondah
Suburbs of Yarra Ranges